Chacocente Wildlife Refuge is a nature reserve in Nicaragua. It is one of the 78 reserves which are officially under protection in the country. It is a site for nesting sea turtles.

References

 Wildlife Reserve Río Escalante - Chacocente - Explore Nicaragua

Protected areas of Nicaragua
Carazo Department